Li Pinxian (1892–1987) was a KMT general from Cangwu County, Guangxi. After the end of the Chinese Civil War in 1949, he immigrated to Taiwan.

Early life

Rising Hunan Army
Li Pinxian was born in a squire family. Early childhood learning. In 1907, he entered the Guangxi Army Primary School created by Cai E. In 1910, he was promoted to the second phase of Hubei Third Army Middle School. The following year, after the Wuchang Uprising broke out, Li Pinxian joined the revolutionary camp. Later, Li Pinxian returned to his hometown and served as a member of the Ordnance Bureau of Wuzhou.

In 1913, he entered the first phase of Baoding Army Officer School. He graduated the next year and returned to his hometown. In 1916, Li Pinxian was transferred to the Hunan Army. Later, under the classmate of Tang Shengzhi, a classmate of Baoding Military Academy, he participated in the Constitutional Protection War and was promoted gradually.

Middle-aged experience
In 1924, he served as the brigade commander of the Eighth Brigade of the Fourth Division of the Hunan Army.
He used to be the commander and commander of the national army. In June 1926, Tang Shengzhi joined the National Revolutionary Army, and Li Pinxian served as the third division commander of the Eighth Army of the National Revolutionary Army. On the occasion of the Northern Expedition of the National Revolutionary Army, he led his troops to capture all parts of Hunan Province and contributed to the defeat of Wu Peifu Army in Hubei Province. In February of the following year, he served as the deputy commander of the Eighth Army; in April he was promoted to commander, concurrently serving as the commander-in-chief of the three towns of Wuhan and the member of the Hubei Provincial Government. After the outbreak of the coup in Shanghai on April 12, Li Pinxian supported Chiang Kai-shek to eliminate the Communist Party of China.

New Guangxi clique
In October 1927, during the Ning-Han War, Li Pinxian followed Tang Shengzhi, who was defeated by Li Zongren of the New Guangxi clique. Li Pinxian was invested in the New Guangxi clique in February 1928. In April, he served as the commander of the 12th Army of the Fourth Army of the National Revolutionary Army and the commander of the 8th Army. Afterwards, he went northward again and disarmed the 30,000 people of the Zhilu Coalition Army in Luanhe and stayed in Tangshan. In March 1929, the Chiang-Gui War broke out and Chiang Kai-shek again used Tang Shengzhi. Li Pinxian returned to Tang Shengzhi and served as deputy commander of the 5th Route Army and commander of the 8th Army. In the summer of the same year, the army moved to Henan, Li Pinxian left due to illness, and Liu Xing served as the commander of the army.

At the end of the same year, Tang Shengzhi once again opposed Chiang Kai-shek. In January of the following year, Tang Shengzhi defeated Li Pinxian and went to Hong Kong. After the outbreak of the Central Plains War, Li Pinxian should be recruited by the new Guangxi clique and served as the supervisor of the aftermath of Hunan. In the Central Plains War, the defeat of the New Guangxi clique, Li Pinxian returned to Guangxi and served as Chief of Staff of the 4th Army Command. Since then, he has served as the principal of the Nanning Military Officer School, the Guangxi Border Defense Supervision Office and the administrative supervision of the Zuojiang District, and the commander of the Longzhou District Civil Corps. In 1935, he once again served as chief of staff of the 4th Army Command. In January 1936, he was promoted to lieutenant general, and in July he served as deputy director of the Guangxi Suijing Office. In March of the following year, he was awarded the rank of General of the Army.

Second Sino-Japanese War
In July 1937, the Second Sino-Japanese War broke out. In December, Li Pinxian served as deputy commander-in-chief of the fifth theater (commander-in-chief Li Zongren) and commander-in-chief of the Eleventh Army (three jurisdictions). He participated in the Battle of Shanghai, Battle of Xuzhou, and Battle of Taierzhuang. He made military achievements by giving the Japanese army a big blow. In June 1938, he participated in the Battle of Wuhan and served as the commander of the Fourth Army Corps of the Wuhan Defense Army. In October of the same year, the Japanese army occupied Wuhan, and the army led by Li Pinxian was more combative than the friendly army. After that, the army went to Hubei Province for recuperation and reorganization. In April 1939, he participated in the Battle of Suixian-Zaoyang (known as the Xiangdong Battle in Japan) and fought against the four Japanese divisions to stop the Japanese offensive and make military contributions.

In November 1939, Li Pinxian was appointed Chairman of the Anhui Provincial Government, Commander-in-Chief of the 21st Army Group and Commander-in-Chief of the Henan-Anhui Border Region. He contributed to the formation of Anhui's anti-Japanese system. In May 1940, the second Sui Zao Hui Jian (the Sui Yi battle. The Japanese side called the Yichang battle) and the Second Battle of Changsha in August 1941, Li Pinxian counterattacked the Japanese army successfully. On the other hand, Li Pinxian also strongly suppressed and eliminated the Communist Party of China, and the relationship with the New Fourth Army became tense. In January 1941, the military headquarters of the New Fourth Army was surrounded and wiped out during the transfer process, which was known as the Wannan Incident. Before this incident, Li Pinxian's anti-blocking of the New Fourth Army in Jiangbei had an important impact on the incident. On June 28, 1943, the National Government sent Li Pinxian as the head of the Anhui Provincial County Commissioner.
Due to repeated military achievements, in January 1945, Li Pinxian was promoted to commander-in-chief of the Tenth Theater District. In June, he was elected as the sixth Central Executive Committee of the Kuomintang. At the end of the Second Sino-Japanese War, Li Pinxian was responsible for the surrender of the Japanese army in Xuzhou.

Chinese Civil War
In April 1946, Li Pinxian served as the chairman of the Anhui Provincial Government; in the same year, he also served as the deputy director of the Xuzhou Suijing Office and participated in the Second Civil War. On July 19, 1947, the National Government sent Li Pinxian as the chairman of the Anhui Election Office; the National Government also appointed him as a representative of the National Assembly and a legislator of the Legislative Yuan.
In 1948, Li Zongren was elected as Vice President of the Republic of China, and Li Pinxian gave full support. In the same year, Li Pinxian served as the deputy chief of the Huazhong Military and Political Office (Chief Executive Bai Chongxi).

In May 1949, he served as Director of Guilin Suijing Office. On June 1, Li Pinxian, director of the Suijing Office of Guangxi, called Lu Han, chairman of the Yunnan Provincial Government, that the Guizhou Army No. 303 Division was stationed in Baise and was ready to enter Yunnan to "assist bandits"; The appeasement headquarters in the border area, with Zhang Guangwei as its commander, openly placed Yunnan into the defense area of the Guangxi Army. Li Pinxian is the chairman of the Guangxi Provincial Government. But he failed to stop the offensive of the Chinese People's Liberation Army and went to Taiwan in December of the same year.

Later life
He went to Taiwan in 1949 and served as an advisor to the Presidential Strategy Advisory Committee. He retired in 1953 and has since served as the neighbor governor of Shuiyuanli in Taipei City.

On March 23, 1987, Li Pinxian died of illness in Taipei. At the age of 98 (96 years old).

References

National Revolutionary Army generals from Guangxi
1892 births
1987 deaths
People from Wuzhou
Taiwanese people from Guangxi